"I Just Can't Be Happy Today" is a song by English punk rock band the Damned from their 1979 album, Machine Gun Etiquette. Released as a single in November on Chiswick Records, it peaked at No. 46 in the UK Singles Chart.

Production
The single was heavily edited for radio airplay, removing the spoken word monologue, though the version on the record is unaltered. The first track on the B-side, a cover of Sweet's "Ballroom Blitz", was recorded with Lemmy of Motörhead fame on bass guitar. "Turkey Song" was not credited on the sleeve.

Live performances
The Damned performed "I Just Can't Be Happy Today" alongside "Smash It Up" on the BBC2 television show The Old Grey Whistle Test in 1979, where they infamously trashed the stage towards the end of the song.

Track listing
 "I Just Can't Be Happy Today" (Dadomo, Scabies, Sensible, Vanian, Ward) - 2:53
 "Ballroom Blitz" (Chapman, Chinn)  - 3:30
 "Turkey Song" (Scabies, Sensible, Vanian, Ward)  - 1:32

Production credits
Producers
 Roger Armstrong
 The Damned

Musicians
 Dave Vanian − vocals
 Captain Sensible − guitar, keyboards, vocals and Mandolin on "Turkey Song"
 Rat Scabies − drums
 Algy Ward − bass
 Lemmy − bass on "Ballroom Blitz"

References

External links

1979 singles
The Damned (band) songs
Songs written by Rat Scabies
Songs written by Captain Sensible
Songs written by David Vanian
Songs written by Algy Ward
Post-punk songs
Chiswick Records singles
Motown singles
1979 songs